The Marine Raider Museum is located at Raider Hall, 24191 Gilbert Road, Camp Barrett, Marine Corps Base Quantico, Quantico, Virginia.  It contains exhibits related to Marine Raiders.  It was originally located in Richmond, Virginia, but was moved to its current location in 2005.  In 1997, the museum won the prestigious Colonel John H. Magruder III Award from the Marine Corps Heritage Foundation.

See also
History of the United States Marine Corps
United States Marine Raider stiletto
Marine Corps Museums

Notes

External links

Marine Corps museums in the United States
Marine Raiders
Museums in Prince William County, Virginia
Military and war museums in Virginia